The Lebanon men's national under-17 basketball team is the junior boy's national basketball team, administered by Lebanese Basketball Federation, that represents Lebanon in international under-17 and under-16 men's basketball competitions.

History

World Cup Qualification

The team represented the country at 2022 FIBA Under-17 Basketball World Cup for the very first time after reaching the 2022 FIBA U16 Asian Championship Semi-Finals.

Tournament records

World Cup

Asia Championship

See also
Sport in Lebanon
Lebanon men's national basketball team
Lebanon men's national under-19 basketball team
Lebanon women's national basketball team
Lebanon women's national under-17 basketball team

References

Men's national under-17 basketball teams
Basketball